The 1972 NCAA University Division baseball tournament was played at the end of the 1972 NCAA University Division baseball season to determine the national champion of college baseball.  The tournament concluded with eight teams competing in the College World Series, a double-elimination tournament in its twenty-sixth year.  Eight regional districts sent representatives to the College World Series with preliminary rounds within each district serving to determine each representative.  These events would later become known as regionals.  Each district had its own format for selecting teams, resulting in 28 teams participating in the tournament at the conclusion of their regular season, and in some cases, after a conference tournament.  The twenty-sixth tournament's champion was Southern California, coached by Rod Dedeaux.  The Most Outstanding Player was Russ McQueen of the University of Southern California.

Regionals
The opening rounds of the tournament were played across eight district sites across the country, each consisting of between two and six teams. The winners of each District advanced to the College World Series.

Bold indicates winner.

District 1 at Storrs, CT

District 2 at Princeton, NJ

District 3 at Gastonia, NC

District 4 at Bowling Green, OH

District 5 at Tulsa, OK

District 6 at San Antonio, TX

District 7 at Mesa, AZ

District 8 at Santa Clara, CA & Santa Barbara, CA

College World Series

Participants

Results

Bracket

Game results

All-Tournament Team
The following players were members of the All-Tournament Team.

Notable players
 Arizona State: Eddie Bane, Alan Bannister, Jim Crawford, Jim Otten, Craig Swan, Jim Umbarger, Bump Wills
 Connecticut: Ed Harvey, Brian Herosian
 Iowa: Jim Sundberg
 Ole Miss: Steve Dillard
 Oklahoma: Joe Simpson, Jackson Todd
 Southern California: Fred Lynn, Ed Putman, Randy Scarbery, Roy Smalley
 Temple: Joe Kerrigan
 Texas: Dave Chalk, Bobby Cuellar, Ken Pape

Tournament Notes
Southern California becomes the first team to win three consecutive College World Series.

See also
 1972 NCAA College Division baseball tournament
 1972 NAIA World Series

References

NCAA Division I Baseball Championship
1972 NCAA University Division baseball season
Baseball in San Antonio